Francisco Zuela (born 3 August 1983) is a former Angolan footballer.

Club career
Zuela started his career in 2002 with the Portuguese club Sertanense F.C. In Portugal, he also represented Académica de Coimbra and C.D. Santa Clara.

In 2005, he signed a contract with the Greek club Akratitos. The next season, he moved to Skoda Xanthi, spending three seasons to the club.

On 8 December 2009, Zuela arrived for a trial with Wigan Athletic, but that trial ended without a contract offer.

In 2009, he moved to Russia and signed with Kuban Krasnodar, but the next year he was given on loan to Alania Vladikavkaz. In July 2012, he was given on loan from Kuban to PAOK in Greece and in the 2011–12 season, he was given again on loan to another Greek club, Atromitos.

On 5 June 2012, Zuela terminated his contract with Kuban and signed a two-year contract with the Cypriot club APOEL. Although he didn't manage to win a regular place in APOEL's starting lineup (he appeared in only six league matches), he became a champion for the first time in his career after winning the 2012–13 Cypriot First Division with the club. On 17 July 2013 his contract with APOEL was mutually terminated.

Later, he had a five-month spell at Apollon Smyrni in Greece, appearing only in one match for twelve minutes as a substitute, and being released before the end of year 2013.

International career
Zuela is a member of the Angola national football team. He has made 17 appearances, without scoring any goal yet.

Honours
 APOEL
Cypriot First Division: 1
 2012–13

References

External links
 APOEL official profile
 Profile & Statistics at Guardian's Stats centre
 
 
 Skoda Xanthi Official Profile * – 

1983 births
Living people
Angolan footballers
Angola international footballers
Angolan expatriate footballers
Footballers from Luanda
2010 Africa Cup of Nations players
2012 Africa Cup of Nations players
2013 Africa Cup of Nations players
Portuguese footballers
Association football defenders
A.P.O. Akratitos Ano Liosia players
Xanthi F.C. players
C.D. Santa Clara players
PAOK FC players
Atromitos F.C. players
FC Spartak Vladikavkaz players
FC Kuban Krasnodar players
APOEL FC players
Sertanense F.C. players
Expatriate footballers in Cyprus
Expatriate footballers in Greece
Expatriate footballers in Russia
Russian Premier League players
Super League Greece players
Cypriot First Division players
Angolan expatriate sportspeople in Cyprus